Labour Economics is a bimonthly peer-reviewed academic journal covering labor economics. It was established in 1993 and is the official journal of the European Association of Labour Economists. It is published by Elsevier and the editor-in-chief is Arthur van Soest (Tilburg University).

According to the Journal Citation Reports, the journal has a 2016 impact factor of 1.036.

Editors in Chief
 Alison Booth (1999–2004)
 Helena Skyt Nielsen (2014–2017)
 Arthur van Soest (2018–present)

References

External links

Labour economics
Economics journals
Publications established in 1993
Bimonthly journals
Elsevier academic journals
English-language journals
Academic journals associated with learned and professional societies
Labour journals